Selah Louise Marley (born November 12, 1998) is an American fashion model and singer. Marley is a daughter of singer-songwriter and rapper Lauryn Hill and football player Rohan Marley, as well as a granddaughter of reggae musician Bob Marley. Marley has walked the runway for Chanel, and has starred in campaigns for Dior, Calvin Klein, Telfar and Michael Kors. She has also made appearances in American Vogue, and has been featured on the covers of Wonderland, Flaunt, UK Sunday Times, and L'Uomo Vogue. In 2017, she was placed on the Maxim Hot 100 list.

Early life and career 
Marley was born to American singer Lauryn Hill and Jamaican entrepreneur Rohan Marley, who never married but had a long-term partnership for 15 years. She is the granddaughter of reggae icon Bob Marley. The name Selah is Hebrew, meaning "meditational pause". Marley has numerous siblings and half-siblings between her parents. The most recent addition is through her father's marriage to Brazilian model Barbara Fialho. Marley contends that her childhood was complex and traumatic at times. 

Born in Miami and raised in South Orange, New Jersey, Marley attended Columbia High School.

Marley is a student of New York University's Gallatin School of Individualized Study, concentrating on science, comparative religion, and philosophy.

Marley started modeling in 2011, when she was featured in Teen Vogue, additionally she has appeared in Vogue, CR Fashion Book, Dazed, Elle, Harper's Bazaar, L'Officiel, Love, Vanity Fair, V, and Vogue Arabia among others. Marley has walked the runway for Chanel, Calvin Klein, Telfar, Pyer Moss, and Kanye West's Adidas Yeezy line. In 2016, The New York Times named her one of 'Fashion's New 'it' Kids'. In 2017, she was featured a campaign alongside Rowan Blanchard, for Converse; and was also featured in a campaign for Michael Kors. In 2018, Marley fronted the Chanel campaign for their Chance fragrance. That same year she was featured in a campaign for Telfar, and Beyoncé's Ivy Park line. Marley also acted as a muse for Dior Beauty.

Marley has been featured on the covers of Wonderland, Flaunt, UK Sunday Times, and L'Uomo Vogue. In 2016, Marley was Placed on Dazed's 'Dazed 100' list. In 2017, she was placed on the Maxim Hot 100 list.

On October 3, 2022, Marley received backlash on social media after participating in Kanye West's Yeezy SZN 9 fashion show in Paris, during which she modeled a shirt with the slogan "WHITE LIVES MATTER". Marley defended her decision to wear the apparel, claiming people are in a "hive mind mentality" and that she did not do so without intention or prior thought.

Filmography

References 

1998 births
Living people
American people of Jamaican descent
American people of Cuban descent
American female models
Columbia High School (New Jersey) alumni
People from Miami
People from South Orange, New Jersey
People from Los Angeles
Models from Florida
Models from New Jersey
Singers from Florida
Singers from New Jersey
New York University Gallatin School of Individualized Study alumni
21st-century American women
Marley family